Defending champion Matteo Berrettini defeated Filip Krajinović in the final, 7–5, 6–4 to win the singles tennis title at the 2022 Queen's Club Championships and successfully defend his title. By winning his fourth title on grass and seventh career ATP Tour singles title overall, Berrettini became the first player in the Open Era to claim the title in their first two appearances at the tournament. Krajinović had never earned a tour-level win on grass before the tournament and was contesting for his first career title in his fifth final.

Seeds

Draw

Finals

Top half

Bottom half

Qualifying

Seeds

Qualifiers

Lucky loser

Draw

First qualifier

Second qualifier

Third qualifier

Fourth qualifier

References

External links
 Qualifying draw
 Main draw

Singles
Queen's Club Championships – Singles